Greene Township may refer to:

Illinois
 Greene Township, Mercer County, Illinois
 Greene Township, Woodford County, Illinois

Indiana
 Greene Township, Jay County, Indiana
 Greene Township, Parke County, Indiana
 Greene Township, St. Joseph County, Indiana

Iowa
 Greene Township, Iowa County, Iowa

Kansas
 Greene Township, Sumner County, Kansas, in Sumner County, Kansas

Missouri
 Greene Township, Worth County, Missouri

North Carolina
 Greene Township, Guilford County, North Carolina, in Guilford County, North Carolina

North Dakota
 Greene Township, Ransom County, North Dakota, in Ransom County, North Dakota

Ohio
 Greene Township, Trumbull County, Ohio

Pennsylvania
 Greene Township, Beaver County, Pennsylvania
 Greene Township, Clinton County, Pennsylvania
 Greene Township, Erie County, Pennsylvania
 Greene Township, Franklin County, Pennsylvania
 Greene Township, Greene County, Pennsylvania
 Greene Township, Mercer County, Pennsylvania
 Greene Township, Pike County, Pennsylvania

See also
 Green Township (disambiguation)

Township name disambiguation pages